Istiglaliyyat Street is an  arterial road in the central uptown part of Baku, Azerbaijan. It begins at Gulustan Palace, located on the southern hillside part of Baku, and continues north, then northeast, terminating at the intersection of Aziz Aliyev and Mammad Amin Rasulzade Streets at the edge of Fountains Square.

Overview of the street
Istiglaliyyat is one of the oldest streets of Baku. The former names of the street were "Nikolayevskaya", honoring the Russian tsar Nikolay I during Russian imperial rule, "Parlamentskaya" after the revolution, and "Kommunisticheskaya" during Soviet rule. After the restoration of Azerbaijan's independence in 1991, the street was renamed to "Istiglaliyyat", which means "Sovereignty" in Azerbaijani. Due to its location in the historic district, it is considered one of the most beautiful parts of Baku. There are many government offices, universities, shops, boutiques, and restaurants on the street.

Notable buildings and monuments located on Istiglaliyyat Street

 Gulustan Palace
 United Nations Representative Office in Azerbaijan
 Presidential Palace, office of the President of Azerbaijan
 Azerbaijan State Philharmonic Hall
 Western University
 Mayoralty of Baku
 Azerbaijan State Economic University
 Azerbaijan National Academy of Sciences
 Icheri Sheher Metro Station
 Ichari Shahar northern wall
 Mirza Alakbar Sabir garden
 Monument to Nizami Ganjavi
 Nizami Museum of Azerbaijan Literature

Picture gallery

References

External links
Kommunisticheksya-Parlamentskaya-Nikolayevskaya-Istiglaliyyat (Baku)
Old street and square names in Baku

Streets in Baku